Alisa Peta Camplin,  (born 10 November 1974) is an Australian aerial skier who won gold at the 2002 Winter Olympics, the second ever winter Olympic gold medal for Australia. At the 2006 Winter Olympics, Camplin finished third to receive a bronze medal. She is the first Australian skier to win medals at consecutive Winter Olympics, making her one of Australia's best skiers.

Background
Camplin is an ex-gymnast, standing at 157 cm tall. She was educated in Melbourne at the Methodist Ladies' College and has a bachelor's degree in information technology from Swinburne University of Technology. As a teenager, Alisa was an accomplished sailor, winning two Australian National Titles in the Hobie Cat catamaran class. Inspired by the example of three-time Olympian Kirstie Marshall, Camplin approached the Olympic Winter Institute of Australia in 1994 to see the possibilities of becoming an aerial skier. She was new to skiing, and even in Salt Lake she trampled on her victory flowers when she fell over during the trip to the winner's news conference.

She practiced jumps in a pond in Wandin (one hour's drive from Melbourne) and was coached by Todd Ossian.

Injuries she has suffered include a broken collarbone, broken hand, separated shoulder, two broken ankles, torn Achilles tendon, torn ACL, and nine concussions.

Before the 2002 Winter Olympics, none of the dozen top 10 results she had made on the World Cup circuit included a victory, and compatriot Jacqui Cooper was viewed as the favourite for the aerials event. While most athletes use flags to mark the start of their jumps, Alisa used a wooden spoon. The rationale was that early in her career, confusion was caused by both Alisa and Jacqui using Australian flags to mark their starts, but in Australia a wooden spoon is a metaphorical prize for people or teams coming last in their sporting event.

Salt Lake City 2002
Alisa competed at the Olympics against doctors' advice—she had injured herself after being caught by a headwind in training a few weeks before. At the time, she was told she had bone bruising, it was not until she was examined by doctors in Salt Lake that she discovered both her ankles were fractured. The doctors were amazed that she was walking, let alone planning to jump.

Jacqui Cooper injured her knee in practice a week before the games. Alisa was so nervous she did not eat dinner the night before the final. Camplin performed a pair of triple-twisting, double backflip jumps to win the event.

Her family had been told to stay home by the athlete because she did not want distractions in the crowd, but her mother and younger sister Georgina defied her, watching her from behind a large Australian flag.

Camplin said that Steven Bradbury's recent win in short track made things easier for her: "When he came through, it almost pleased me that I didn't have to go out and do this," she said. "I knew that was a big thing my nation was trying to chase. When Steven did it, I was like, 'Good, I don't have the weight of the nation on my shoulders.'"

Camplin's gold was celebrated by Australia Post issuing a 45-cent stamp of her. Her stamp was issued on 22 February, four days after her victory. She received A$20,000 for the use of her image. Camplin was delighted, saying "For us to be put in with the summer Olympians who had their stamps and the previous 39 sporting legends who’ve had their stamps is amazing."

Turin 2006
In her preparations for the Turin Winter Olympics, Camplin incurred a serious knee injury in October 2005, requiring a knee reconstruction.  To speed the healing process, she used the relatively uncommon practice of using donor tissue in the knee, and returned to limited training only 11 weeks after the surgery.  She finished fourth at a World Cup event in Lake Placid to secure her place in the team.

On 22 February, in a night competition that was marked by a thick fog that disturbed competitions to an extent, Camplin registered a score of 94.99 in her first jump, the fourth best.  In the second jump, she received a 96.40, which temporarily placed her second, a silver medal.  She was, however, eventually dislodged by China's Li Nina, finishing third behind Switzerland's Evelyne Leu, who won the event, and Nina, who took silver.  She also benefited from the unexpected fall of China's Xinxin Guo, who had received the highest score in the first jump and was expected to secure a place in the Olympic podium—at which time Camplin, who was already third then, would have gone out of the medal zone.

She was selected to be the Australian flag-bearer at the Opening Ceremony.

Post-skiing career
Camplin announced her retirement from competition in July 2006.  She intends to pursue interests in the media and in the ski travel industry.

As of 30 July 2006, she is an international executive for IBM, works as a motivational speaker, and does promotional and charity work. Camplin currently works as a senior executive at IBM managing a team of over 300 people. She has been the face of Wrigley's Extra chewing gum in Australia since shortly after the 2002 Winter Olympics. She is also a judge on the Australian television competition Torvill and Dean's Dancing on Ice, and runs Alisa Camplin Ski Tours.

On 4 November 2009, Alisa Camplin was one of 15 international torchbearers taking part in the relay's International media program, aimed at increasing global coverage of the cross-Canada relay.  She ran on day 6 of the Vancouver 2010 Winter Olympic torch relay through the town of Dawson City in the Yukon Territory.

On 8 December 2009, it was announced that Alisa has joined the Collingwood Football Club board as a replacement for Sally Capp.

Personal life
Camplin married Oliver Warner in December 2010. Their first child, Finnan Maximus Camplin-Warner, was born six weeks prematurely on 10 March 2011. Finnan died 10 days later due to a congenital heart condition. Camplin and Warner have set up the charity Finnan's Gift (http://finnansgift.com), organised through the Royal Children's Hospital, to raise money to buy equipment that will detect heart defects in other babies. On 3 October 2013, Camplin gave birth to their second child, Florence Camplin-Warner. On 20 July 2016, Camplin gave birth to their third child, Felix Camplin-Warner.

Honours
Camplin received the Australian Sports Medal in 2000. She was awarded a Medal of the Order of Australia in 2003 for her 2002 gold medal win. In 2008, she was inducted into the Sport Australia Hall of Fame. In the 2019 Queen's Birthday Honours Camplin was appointed a Member of the Order of Australia in recognition of her "significant service to the community through support for paediatric health care".

References

External links
 
 
 
 
 
 
 Flying high: Camplin's aerials win gives Australia another gold
 She comes from the land Down Under : Aussie aerialist Camplin captures gold in dramatic fashion
 Camplin to Carry Australian Flag – sportal.com.au, Friday 10 February
 Finnan's Gift

1974 births
Living people
Australian female freestyle skiers
Freestyle skiers at the 2002 Winter Olympics
Freestyle skiers at the 2006 Winter Olympics
Olympic freestyle skiers of Australia
Olympic gold medalists for Australia
Olympic bronze medalists for Australia
Sportswomen from Victoria (Australia)
Swinburne University of Technology alumni
Olympic medalists in freestyle skiing
Medalists at the 2006 Winter Olympics
Medalists at the 2002 Winter Olympics
Members of the Order of Australia
Recipients of the Australian Sports Medal
Recipients of the Medal of the Order of Australia
Sport Australia Hall of Fame inductees
People educated at Methodist Ladies' College, Melbourne
Skiers from Melbourne